Iliev Glacier is the 5 km long and 1.5 km wide glacier located within the Lassus Mountains, situated in the northern portion of Alexander Island, Antarctica. It drains the northwest slopes of Mount Wilbye, the east slopes of Vittoria Buttress and the west slopes of Galerius Peak to flow into Lazarev Bay just south of the terminus of Palestrina Glacier.

The glacier is named after the Bulgarian composer Diko Iliev (1898-1984).

Location

See also
 List of glaciers in the Antarctic
 Lennon Glacier
 Palestrina Glacier
 Rosselin Glacier
 Glaciology

Maps
 British Antarctic Territory. Scale 1:200000 topographic map No. 3127. DOS 610 - W 69 70. Tolworth, UK, 1971.
 Antarctic Digital Database (ADD). Scale 1:250000 topographic map of Antarctica. Scientific Committee on Antarctic Research (SCAR). Since 1993, regularly upgraded and updated.

References
 Iliev Glacier. SCAR Composite Gazetteer of Antarctica.
 Bulgarian Antarctic Gazetteer. Antarctic Place-names Commission. (details in Bulgarian, basic data in English)

External links
 Iliev Glacier. Copernix satellite image

Glaciers of Alexander Island
Bulgaria and the Antarctic